Mehmet Güreli (born 1949 in Istanbul) is a Turkish writer, painter, director and musician. He graduated from Istanbul University, majoring in philosophy. He started working for the Hürriyet newspaper in 1976. He is noted for his work across numerous art media.

Albums 
1988 - Vapurlar/Blues (Ferries/Blues)
1995 - Cihangir'de Bir Gece (A Night in Cihangir)
1999 - Yağmur (Rain)
2002 - Odamda Yolculuk (Voyage in my Room)
2007 - İplerin Kopuşu
2010 - Kimse Bilmez
2016 - Zamboni Sokağı
2019 - Oda Müziği - 1
2020 - Koş Git Bir de Sen Bak
2021 - Mehmet Güreli ile Buluşmalar

Books 
1985 - Sıcak Bir Göz (A Warm Eye)
1993 - Alope'nin Odası (Alope's Room)
2009 - Hayaller Ve Sokaklar
2015 - Bedrufi'nin Nefesi

Movies 
1986 - Vapurlar (Ferries)
2003 - A Documentary on Necdet Mahfi Ayral
2006 - İstanbul'a Yolculuk - Dünya Yazarlarının Gözüyle (A Voyage to İstanbul - From the Eyes of International Authors): A Documentary
2008 - Gölge (Shadow)

References

External links 

31 Türk Filmi vizyona girecek
Türk filmi yağmuru - SİNEMA. Star Gazete, Turkey - Aug 11, 2008

1949 births
Living people
Turkish artists
Turkish musicians
Turkish painters
Turkish columnists
Taraf people
Istanbul University alumni
Artists from Istanbul
Writers from Istanbul